{{DISPLAYTITLE:c+-probability}}
In statistics, a c+-probability is the probability that a contrast variable obtains a positive value.
Using a replication probability, the c+-probability is defined as follows: if we get a random draw from each group (or factor level) and calculate the sampled value of the contrast variable based on the random draws, then the c+-probability is the chance that the sampled values of the contrast variable are greater than 0 when the random drawing process is repeated infinite times. The c+-probability is a probabilistic index accounting for distributions of compared groups (or factor levels).

The c+-probability and SMCV are two characteristics of a contrast variable. There is a link between SMCV and c+-probability.
  The SMCV and c+-probability provides a consistent interpretation to the strength of comparisons in contrast analysis.  When only two groups are involved in a comparison, the c+-probability becomes d+-probability which is the probability that the difference of values from two groups is positive.  To some extent, the d+-probability (especially in the independent situations) is equivalent to the well-established probabilistic index P(X > Y). Historically, the index P(X > Y) has been studied and applied in many areas.

   The c+-probability and d+-probability have been used for data analysis in high-throughput experiments and biopharmaceutical research.

See also
 Contrast (statistics)
 Effect size
 SSMD
 SMCV
 Contrast variable
 ANOVA

References

Regression analysis
Biostatistics